A referendum on a draft constitution was held in the Cayman Islands on 20 May 2009 alongside general elections. The new constitution was approved by 63% of voters, and by the Privy Council on 10 June.

Background
Since around 2000 the Cayman Islands had sought a new constitution, in order to cement the United Kingdom's possession of the islands. On 22 May 2008 the Caymanian government had announced the question and that it was aiming to hold the referendum in July. However, following an announcement on 27 June, the referendum was postponed until the 2009 general elections in order to give time to negotiate and agree the constitution with the UK. The negotiations took place in January and February 2009 and a consultation started in the islands on 11 February 2009.

On 24 February the Legislative Assembly passed the Referendum (Constitutional Modernisation) Bill, 2009. The referendum was to be held in accordance with Article 29, paragraph 2 of the constitution, and required a majority to pass.

Results

References

2009 referendums
Referendums in the Cayman Islands
2009 in the Cayman Islands
Constitutional referendums